The Tuo River (pinyin: Tuó Jiāng) is -long river in Sichuan province of southern China.

The Tuo River is one of the major tributaries of the upper Yangtze River (Chang Jiang).

Geography
The river originates at the northwest edge of Sichuan basin. It flows through Jintang, Jianyang, Ziyang, Zizhong, and Neijiang.

It flows into Yangtze River in  Luzhou, Sichuan.

See also
Index: Tributaries of the Yangtze River
List of rivers in China

References
Great Soviet Encyclopedia

Rivers of Sichuan
Tributaries of the Yangtze River